"The First the Last Eternity (Till the End)" is a song by German Eurodance project Snap!, released in 1995 as the second single from their third studio album, Welcome to Tomorrow (1994). Like on their previous single, "Welcome to Tomorrow (Are You Ready?)", it features vocals by American singer Summer (a.k.a. Paula Brown). Supported by a partially computer generated music video, the song was a chart success in Europe, peaking at number two in both Belgium and the Netherlands, and number three in Austria.

Release
"The First the Last Eternity (Till the End)" was released in February 1995. In the 2020 book Move Your Body (2 The 90's), writer Juha Soininen noted that the new Snap! songs "were [now] harder, but at the same time [with] lighter sound. They were more clearly Eurodance than the previous efforts, but the darker aspect of Snap! sound was absent and replaced with a happier vibe."

Critical reception
In his weekly UK chart commentary, James Masterton remarked that "Snap have undergone something of a metamorphosis since the hard-edged days of Turbo B and have reinvented themselves as mellow trance-pop specialists." He added that here, "new vocalist Summer [is] dreaming her way through a pleasant enough song to give the group their 10th Top 20 hit since 1990." British magazine Music Week wrote, "Again featuring vocalist Summer, Snap's latest dance tune is a catchy little number somewhat marred by the fact that "Eternity" seems to be the only lyric in the whole song." An editor, Alan Jones, felt the new single "is a more direct but less likable track, with pounding rhythms supporting Summer's vocals, which are not nearly as distinctive or powerful as those of some of Snap's previous singers." James Hamilton from the RM Dance Update described it as a "Summer moaned (and sometimes not un-Donna Summer-like) frantic swirling throbber".

Chart performance
"The First the Last Eternity (Till the End)" was successful on the charts in Europe, peaking at number two in Belgium (in both Flanders and Wallonia) and the Netherlands. It was a top 10 hit also in Austria (number three), Germany (number seven) and Switzerland (number five), as well as on the Eurochart Hot 100, where it made it to number seven. Additionally, the single was a top 20 hit in Finland, Scotland and the UK. In the latter, it peaked at number 15 in its third week on the UK Singles Chart, on April 9, 1995. It also charted on the UK Dance Chart, where it reached number 29, and in Ireland and Iceland, where it was a top 30 hit.

Music video
The accompanying music video for "The First the Last Eternity (Till the End)" was directed by Angel and is made like a 1940s film noir, shown as a comic story turning from page to page. Singer Summer performs as a femme fatale on the street in New York, outside a cinema, wearing a red dress and black gloves. The lyrics are shown in talk bubbles throughout the story. The opening and ending of the video shows the singer on the cover of cinema posters outside the cinema. It was later published on Snap!'s official YouTube channel in May 2011. The video has amassed more than 2,3 million views as of September 2021.

Track listing
 CD single
"The First the Last Eternity (Till the End)" (7" Edit) – 3:54
"The First the Last Eternity (Till the End)" (Noto Edit) – 4:04

 CD maxi
"The First the Last Eternity (Till the End)" (7" Edit) – 3:54
"The First the Last Eternity (Till the End)" (GDC Mix) – 6:28
"The First the Last Eternity (Till the End)" (Notonom Mix) – 6:52

Charts

Weekly charts

Year-end charts

References

Snap! songs
1995 songs
1995 singles
Arista Records singles
Electro songs
English-language German songs
Music videos directed by Angel (director)